Long View High School, located in Lakewood, Colorado, United States, is a small alternative Jefferson County public school, the smallest comprehensive public school in the Denver metropolitan area. Long View was started in 1994 as an educational option within Jefferson County Public Schools. It is designed to serve high school students, grades 10–12, whose needs are not being met by traditional, comprehensive high schools.

References

External links 

Educational institutions established in 1994
Public high schools in Colorado
Education in Lakewood, Colorado
Schools in Jefferson County, Colorado
1994 establishments in Colorado